Maurice Dewayne Hooker (born August 7, 1989) is an American professional boxer who held the WBO light welterweight title from 2018 to 2019 and challenged for the WBC light welterweight title in 2019. As of August 2020, he is ranked as the world's sixth best active light welterweight by the Transnational Boxing Rankings Board.

Professional career

Hooker vs. Flanagan 
Hooker turned professional in 2011 and compiled a record of 23-0-3 before challenging and beating British boxer Terry Flanagan in an upset on June 9, 2018 for the vacant WBO light welterweight title in Manchester England on the Tyson Fury vs. Sefer Seferi undercard.

Hooker vs. Ramirez 
On 27 July 2019, Hooker fought WBC super lightweight champion Jose Ramirez in a unification bout. Ramirez managed to get the better out of Hooker and won the fight via a sixth-round TKO.

Hooker vs. Perez 
In his next fight, Hooker fought Uriel Perez. Hooker won the fight in the first round.

Hooker vs. Ortiz Jr 
On 20 March 2021, Hooker fought Vergil Ortiz Jr, who was ranked #2 by the WBO and #6 by the WBC at welterweight. Ortiz Jr was the better man, first knocking Hooker down in the sixth round, before finishing him in the seventh with a TKO victory.

Professional boxing record

See also
List of light-welterweight boxing champions

References

External links

Maurice Hooker - Profile, News Archive & Current Rankings at Box.Live

 

1989 births
Living people
American male boxers
African-American boxers
Sportspeople from Dallas
Boxers from Texas
Light-welterweight boxers
World light-welterweight boxing champions
World Boxing Organization champions
21st-century African-American sportspeople
20th-century African-American people